Aleh Tsyvinski is a Belarusian-American economist who is currently the Arthur M. Okun Professor of Economics at Yale University. On 31 March 2021, it was announced that Tsyvinski became a part-time professor at New Economic School in Russia.

References 

Living people
1977 births
21st-century American economists
University of Minnesota College of Liberal Arts alumni
Belarusian economists
Belarus State Economic University alumni
Fellows of the Econometric Society